Josip "Joško" Domorocki (1917–1992) was a Bosnian-Herzegovinian footballer. He was born in Sarajevo, where he lived for most of his life, and played for several clubs in the Yugoslav First League. He also trained and worked as a locksmith.

Playing career
When he was 17, he started playing for FK Željezničar Sarajevo. Two years later, he went to Belgrade to serve in the army. While in Belgrade, he played for SK Jugoslavija and for the B squad of the Yugoslav national team. In 1940, he returned to Sarajevo and played for SAŠK. When World War II ended in 1945, he played with FK Udarnik, and later with Jedinstvo Sušak. He returned to Željezničar in 1946 and played with them until 1952.

He is particularly remembered for his defiance of the authorities over the creation of FK Sarajevo. When this team was created (as SD Torpedo) in 1946 by the merge of FK Udarnik and OFK Sloboda, several of the best players at FK Željezničar were ordered to play for the new club, to represent Sarajevo and Bosnia-Herzegovina at a national level. Despite the tough attitude of the new communist government towards dissent, Domorocki refused (even after the offer of a flat and two new suits, which was a serious incentive at that time), and continued to play for Željezničar, where he stayed for six years as a player, and then worked subsequently.

Managerial career
He later coached FK Rudar Breza.

Death
Domorocki died in a car accident in Split in 1992.

References

1917 births
1992 deaths
Footballers from Sarajevo
People from the Condominium of Bosnia and Herzegovina
Association footballers not categorized by position
Bosnia and Herzegovina footballers
Yugoslav footballers
FK Željezničar Sarajevo players
SK Jugoslavija players
NK SAŠK Napredak players
Yugoslav First League players
Bosnia and Herzegovina football managers
Yugoslav football managers
FK Željezničar Sarajevo managers
Road incident deaths in Yugoslavia
Road incident deaths in Croatia
Royal Yugoslav Army personnel